is a Japanese manga series by Shimpei Itoh. It was adapted into a two episode OVA by Triangle Staff between September 25, 1995 and November 25, 1995. The story is about two alien androids that are sent from space to defend the Earth. An English-dubbed version of the OVA was later released in the US by Pioneer Entertainment (later Geneon) in VHS & LaserDisc format in two volumes, each containing a single episode, between March 26, 1996 and June 18, 1996. The OVA series was released on DVD in Japan on October 23, 1998 and in the US on November 21, 2000.

Plot
Mew and Mica, two spacey alien androids, pose as cute high school students to conceal their identities as the most undependable dynamic duo ever sent to defend the Earth.  The OVA follows the misadventures of Mew, Mica and their reluctant friend, Akai.

Characters
Mew Fumizuki
Hyper Doll Mew, has short blue hair and is quieter and more laid back than Mica.

Mica Minazuki
Hyper Doll Mica has long red hair and is more outgoing.

Hideo Akai
Classmate of Mew and Mica who knows the secret identities of the Hyper Dolls. Slightly afraid of them, due to them threatening to twist his head off.

Shouko Aida
Another classmate of Mew and Mica's. Constantly attempting to find the identities of the Hyper Dolls. May have a crush on Akai.

Detective Toudou
Local police officer who is in over his head when facing super-powered threats to the city. An unashamed fan of the Dolls.

Commander
The Hyper Dolls' commander who sent them to defend the Earth. He is very slug-like in appearance and appears on various foods in holographic form.

Cast

Anime

Music
Opening theme

Lyrics: Natsuko Karedo
Music: Hiromoto Hisawa
Arrangement: Ikuro Fujiwara
Performed by Mayumi Iizuka and Yukana Nogami

Ending theme
 (Episode 1)
Lyrics: Yū Aku
Music: Shunichi Tokura
Performed by Mayumi Iizuka and Yukana Nogami

 (Episode 2)
Lyrics: Machiko Ryū
Music: Kōichi Morita
Performed by Mayumi Iizuka, Yukana Nogami, and Yuri Shiratori

References

External links

1995 anime OVAs
1995 manga
Comedy anime and manga
Geneon USA
NBCUniversal Entertainment Japan
Science fiction anime and manga
Shōnen manga